Cumhur Yılmaztürk (born 5 January 1990) is a Turkish footballer playing as defensive midfielder for Bayburt Özel İdarespor.

External links
 
 

1990 births
People from Bakırköy
Footballers from Istanbul
Living people
Turkish footballers
Association football midfielders
Galatasaray A2 footballers
Galatasaray S.K. footballers
Çaykur Rizespor footballers
Kahramanmaraşspor footballers
Altay S.K. footballers
Gümüşhanespor footballers
Fethiyespor footballers
İnegölspor footballers
Niğde Anadolu FK footballers
Süper Lig players
TFF First League players
TFF Second League players
TFF Third League players